Rachid Khdar (born 16 August 1967) is a Moroccan wrestler. He competed in the men's Greco-Roman 62 kg at the 1992 Summer Olympics.

References

External links
 

1967 births
Living people
Moroccan male sport wrestlers
Olympic wrestlers of Morocco
Wrestlers at the 1992 Summer Olympics
Place of birth missing (living people)